Euphoria is a genus of scarab beetles in the subfamily Cetoniinae, the flower or fruit chafers. They are native to the Americas, where they are distributed from Canada to Argentina. They are most diverse in Mexico and Central America. As of 2012, there are 59 species in the genus.

Description and biology
Euphoria species can be highly variable in color and pattern making species identification difficult.

The larvae are generally found buried a few centimeters deep in soil rich in organic matter such as compost, dung, animal burrows, packrat middens, and ant nests. In at least some species, the pupa develops in a subterranean cell with a thin wall made of feces mixed with soil. Some species overwinter as adults, and others as larvae.

Diversity

Species include:
Euphoria abreona
Euphoria anneae
Euphoria areata
Euphoria avita
Euphoria basalis
Euphoria biguttata 
Euphoria bispinis
Euphoria boliviensis
Euphoria candezei
Euphoria canaliculata
Euphoria canescens
Euphoria casselberryi
Euphoria chontalensis
Euphoria devulsa
Euphoria dimidiata
Euphoria diminuta
Euphoria discicollis
Euphoria eximia
Euphoria fascifera 
Euphoria fulgida
Euphoria fulveola
Euphoria geminata
Euphoria hera
Euphoria herbacea
Euphoria hidrocalida
Euphoria hirtipes
Euphoria histrionica 
Euphoria humilis
Euphoria inda
Euphoria iridescens
Euphoria kernii
Euphoria lacandona 
Euphoria leprosa
Euphoria lesueuri
Euphoria leucographa
Euphoria levinotata 
Euphoria limbalis
Euphoria lurida
Euphoria mayita
Euphoria montana
Euphoria monticola 
Euphoria mystica
Euphoria nicaraguensis 
Euphoria paradisiaca
Euphoria pilipennis
Euphoria pulchella
Euphoria quadricollis
Euphoria schotti
Euphoria sepulcralis
Euphoria sonorae
Euphoria steinheili
Euphoria subguttata
Euphoria submaculosa
Euphoria subtomentosa
Euphoria vestita
Euphoria verticalis 
Euphoria vittata
Euphoria westermanni
Euphoria yucateca

References

Cetoniinae
Beetles of North America
Beetles of South America